Eighth Grade is a 2018 American comedy-drama film written and directed by Bo Burnham. It is his feature film directorial debut. The plot follows the life and struggles of an eighth-grader, played by Elsie Fisher, during her last week of classes before graduating to high school. She struggles with anxiety in social situations but produces video blogs giving life advice. A24 gave Eighth Grade its limited release on July 13, before moving it to wide release August 3.

On the review aggregator Rotten Tomatoes, the film holds an approval rating of 99% based on 217 reviews, with an average rating of 8.9/10. The website's critical consensus reads, "Eighth Grade takes a look at its titular time period that offers a rare and resounding ring of truth while heralding breakthroughs for writer-director Bo Burnham and captivating star Elsie Fisher." On Metacritic, the film has a weighted average score of 89 out of 100, based on 46 critics, indicating "universal acclaim". Eighth Grade completed its North American run grossing $13.5 million on a $2 million budget. 

The film was entered into competition for the Grand Jury Prize at the 2018 Sundance Film Festival. It had a leading number of nominations (after We the Animals) at the Independent Spirit Awards with four, including Best Film. Fisher received her first Golden Globe nomination for the film, but the film was not nominated for Best Motion Picture – Musical or Comedy despite reporter Kyle Buchanan considering it to be A24's best candidate for the category.

Accolades

References

External links 
 

Lists of accolades by film